A Love to Hide (French title: Un amour à taire) is a French film made for television, directed by Christian Faure, which aired in 2005. It is loosely based on the book Moi, Pierre Seel, déporté homosexuel by Pierre Seel.

Plot summary

The action takes place in France during the Second World War.

A young Jewish girl, Sarah, is looking to escape the clutches of the Third Reich after seeing her parents and sister brutally slain by a smuggler who betrayed them while attempting to escape to England. Terrified, she is sheltered by her childhood friend Jean, a homosexual in a clandestine relationship with his lover Philippe.

They are safe for the moment, thanks to Jean's plan to pass her off as a Christian employee of his laundromat, under the name Yvonne. However, a bad decision made by Jean's troublesome brother Jacques causes Jean to be wrongly accused of being the lover of a German officer. Jean is then forced into a Nazi labor camp.

Cast
 Jeremie Renier as Jean Lavandier
 Charlotte de Turckheim as Marcelle Lavandier 
 Bruno Todeschini as Philippe
 Michel Jonasz as Armand Lavandier
 Louise Monot as Sarah Morgenstern
 Nicolas Gob as Jacques Lavandier
 Olivier Saladin as Breton
 Yulian Vergov as Johann Von Berg

Production
A Love to Hide is the second film of director Christian Faure dealing with homosexuality. He had previously directed Just a Question of Love (2000), a made-for-television film chronicling a love story between two young men.

This is one of few films about the deportation of homosexuals during World War II. (Also see Bent.)  A Love to Hide is loosely based on the book Moi, Pierre Seel, déporté homosexuel by Pierre Seel published in 1994.

External links

2005 television films
2005 films
2000s French-language films
French LGBT-related films
Holocaust films
Persecution of homosexuals in Nazi Germany
Films shot in Bulgaria
2005 LGBT-related films
LGBT-related drama films
French drama films
Gay-related films
2000s French films